Meher Dossa Minwalla (born 10 December 1977) is a Pakistani former cricketer who played as a right-arm medium-fast bowler. She appeared in 11 One Day Internationals for Pakistan between 1997 and 2001.

References

External links
 
 

1977 births
Living people
Pakistani women cricketers
Pakistan women One Day International cricketers
Place of birth missing (living people)